Akufuna Tatila (died 1887) was a Litunga, Chief of the Lozi people of Barotseland in Africa, but he ruled for a very short time and his power was weak. His full title was Mulena Yomuhulu Mbumu wa Litunga.

Father of Akufuna was Chief Imbua Mulumbwa.

Before he became a king of Lozi, Akufuna was a High Chief of Lukwakwa. In September 1884 Akufuna began to rule, but was deposed by great king Lewanika in 1885. 

Akufuna was killed by Mulanziana Sitwala.

See also 
List of monarchs who lost their thrones in the 19th century
Lewanika

Sources 

Litungas
Year of birth missing
1887 deaths
Royalty of Barotseland